The Internationalist Communist Union (French: Union Communiste Internationaliste) is an international grouping of Trotskyist political parties, centred on Lutte Ouvrière in France.

It believes that the socialist transformation of society can be accomplished only by the working class, consciously fighting in its own class interests, and therefore that the task of revolutionary groups is to construct a working class revolutionary party. The ICU believes that the only possible programmatic basis for revolutionaries rests on Marxist ideas in the tradition of the Russian Revolution of 1917 and its Bolshevik leaders Vladimir Lenin and Leon Trotsky. The militants from this tendency focus their activities, whether propaganda or intervention, within the working class.

Associated groups

See also 
List of Trotskyist internationals

External links
Union Communiste website

References